Anima (stylized in uppercase), formerly known as Globe Studios, is a Filipino entertainment production company. It focuses on co-producing film, television and online series content.

Anima is owned by Kroma Entertainment (formerly Sphere Entertainment), a new entertainment company backed by Globe Telecom through its Retirement Fund agency.

Filmography

Film

Upcoming films

Television and online

Music videos

Podcast shows

Notes

References

External links

Film production companies of the Philippines
Philippine film studios
Mass media companies established in 2016
Globe Telecom subsidiaries